Edward Joel Kowalczyk (born July 16, 1971) is an American singer, songwriter, musician and a founding member of the band Live. After leaving Live in 2009, he launched a solo career. His first album, Alive, was released worldwide in June and July 2010. He rejoined Live in December 2016.

Early life
Kowalczyk was born to a family of Polish descent. He grew up in York, Pennsylvania and attended William Penn Senior High School in the York City School District, where he met the other three members of what would become Live. His father was a teacher at the local Northeastern High School.

Career
Ed Kowalczyk was the lead singer, lyricist, and main songwriter for the band Live from its formation until 2009, then rejoined the band in December 2016. In 2009, he left the band and the other three members issued a statement detailing what they felt were inappropriate actions by Kowalczyk in regards to contract and salary negotiations. Kowalczyk was sued by the band, seeking damages and an injunction against using the name "Live". Ed rejoined the band in December 2016 after months of rumors. In June 2022, Kowalczyk took a 55% controlling ownership of the band, immediately firing founding guitarist Chad Taylor from the band. In October 2022, Kowalczyk and three new musicians began performing as Live without Patrick Dahlheimer and Chad Gracey, leaving Kowalczyk as the sole founding member of the band.

Following his departure from Live, Kowalczyk recorded his first solo album, Alive, which was released in 2010. In 2012, he recorded The Garden and in 2013 The Flood and the Mercy. In 2014-2016 he embarked on an extensive tour celebrating the 20th anniversary of Throwing Copper, playing acoustic concerts across the U.S., Europe and Australia.

Kowalczyk has worked with musicians Stuart Davis and Glen Ballard and singers Anouk, Neneh Cherry, Adam Duritz of Counting Crows, Red Wanting Blue, and Shelby Lynne. He featured on the song "Evolution Revolution Love," from the 2001 Tricky album Blowback. He collaborated with Chris Frantz, Jerry Harrison and Tina Weymouth (ex-Talking Heads, then performing as The Heads) on the song "Indie Hair" from their 1996 album No Talking, Just Head.

He appeared in the David Fincher film Fight Club as a waiter, his only film acting credit to date.

Political activities
Kowalczyk performed John Lennon's "Imagine" with Slash in 2003 at "Peace on the Beach," a rally to protest the coming War in Iraq. In 2008, he appeared in a video with will.i.am from The Black Eyed Peas, John Legend, Scarlett Johansson, and Nick Cannon, supporting U.S. presidential candidate Barack Obama and appeared at campaign rallies for Obama with will.i.am.

Kowalczyk is a member of Canadian charity Artists Against Racism and has worked with them on awareness campaigns.

Discography

Solo studio albums

Solo extended plays

Solo singles

Songs in TV
 "Evolution Revolution Love" (Tricky featuring Ed Kowalczyk) was used in the NBC series The West Wing in the episode "Manchester (Part 1)".
 "The Great Beyond" was included on the soundtrack of the 2011 film Killing Bono.

References

External links
 

1971 births
20th-century American male singers
20th-century American singers
21st-century American male singers
21st-century American singers
American people of Polish descent
Alternative rock singers
American alternative rock musicians
American male singer-songwriters
American rock singers
American rock songwriters
Live (band) members
Living people
Musicians from York, Pennsylvania
Singer-songwriters from Pennsylvania
V2 Records artists
Rhythm guitarists
Guitarists from Pennsylvania
American male guitarists